Mert Hakan Yandaş (born 19 August 1994) is a Turkish professional footballer who plays as a midfielder for Süper Lig club Fenerbahçe.

Professional career
Yandaş joined Sivasspor in 2017 after a couple successful seasons in the lower Turkish leagues with Menemen Belediyespor and Tirespor 1922. He made his professional debut for Sivasspor in a 2–0 Süper Lig win over Yeni Malatyaspor on 19 August 2017.

International career
Yandaş made his debut with the Turkey national football team in a 1-0 UEFA Nations League loss to Hungary on 3 September 2020.

Career statistics

Club

International
As of match played 3 September 2020.

References

External links

 
 
 
 
 Sivasspor Profile

1994 births
Living people
People from Osmangazi
Turkish footballers
Turkey international footballers
Sivasspor footballers
Fenerbahçe S.K. footballers
TFF First League players
Süper Lig players
Association football midfielders